Jens Arnfinn Brødsjømoen (born 19 January 1958) is a Norwegian politician for the Christian Democratic Party.

He served as a deputy representative to the Parliament of Norway from Telemark during the terms 1993–1997 and 1997–2001. In total he was present during 8 days of parliamentary session.

On the local level he has been deputy mayor of Drangedal, and also employed as chief financial officer of Drangedal municipality.

References

1958 births
Living people
People from Drangedal
Deputy members of the Storting
Christian Democratic Party (Norway) politicians
Politicians from Telemark
Norwegian civil servants
Chief financial officers